When I Was Mortal is a short story collection by the Spanish writer Javier Marías. It was translated into English by Margaret Jull Costa and published in the United Kingdom in 1999 by The Harvill Press and in the United States in 2000 by New Directions.

External links
When I Was Mortal reviewed by Elizabeth Judd, New York Times, May 21, 2000.
When I Was Mortal at Complete Review. Includes links to many reviews.

Works by Javier Marías
1996 short story collections
Spanish short story collections
Ghost narrator
Alfaguara books